KZLW (90.1 FM) is a radio station licensed to Gretna, Nebraska, United States. The station airs a format consisting of Christian talk and teaching and Christian music, and is currently owned by My Bridge Radio. The station's transmitter is located near Wahoo, Nebraska, and it serves Greater Omaha and areas to its west.

Posts from "Upper Midwest Broadcasting" at northpine.com

"My Bridge Radio Adds Station near Omaha
Posted on April 30, 2019 by Jon Ellis

The Christian “My Bridge Radio” network is getting closer to Omaha with the purchase of KZLW/90.1 (Gretna) from Calvary Chapel Omaha/Maranatha Fellowship.

An asset purchase agreement filed with the FCC indicates My Bridge will pay $135,000 for KZLW, which delivers a fringe signal to Omaha with a 100 kW signal transmitting from 21 meters above average terrain from near Wahoo.

My Bridge owns seven other full-power stations in Nebraska, including KRKR/95.1 (Waverly-Lincoln), which overlaps with KZLW's coverage area.

KZLW currently carries Contemporary Christian music and Bible verses as “Living Waters Radio” from a studio at Maranatha Fellowship in Bellevue. The format is simulcast on KHLW/89.3 (Tabor, IA), which is not included in the sale."

"KZLW/90.1 (Gretna, NE) went silent July 19 while new owner My Bridge Radio looks for a new tower site. KZLW had previously transmitted with 100kW from a tower near Wahoo that is 120 feet tall, which is much shorter than towers normally used by stations with such high power."

References

External links
mybridgeradio.net

ZLW